Edita Ungurytė (born 30 July 1987) is a road cyclist from Lithuania. She represented her nation at the 2009 UCI Road World Championships.

References

External links
 profile at Procyclingstats.com

1987 births
Lithuanian female cyclists
Living people